SS Badger State may refer to:

SS Badger State (1919), a possible name assigned to the transport  before she was launched
SS Badger State (1943), a cargo ship launched in 1943 and sunk in 1970, and that served in the United States Navy as the transport  from 1944 to 1945

Ship names